Ri Kyong-chol (born 8 March 1979) is a North Korean long-distance runner who specializes in the marathon. His personal best time is 2:11:36 hours, achieved at the 2005 Pyongyang Marathon.

He finished 32nd at the 2005 World Championships. He also finished fourteenth in the half marathon at the 2003 Summer Universiade, ninth at the 2006 Asian Games and won the 2005 and 2006 Pyongyang Marathon.

Achievements

References

1979 births
Living people
North Korean male marathon runners
Athletes (track and field) at the 2006 Asian Games
Asian Games competitors for North Korea